Let Go may refer to:

Music 
 Let Go (band), an American rock band

Albums
 Let Go (Avril Lavigne album), 2002
 Let Go (Bonnie Pink album), 2000
 Let Go (Brother Phelps album) or the title song (see below), 1993
 Let Go (Hundredth album) or the title song, 2011
 Let Go (John Fahey album) or the title song, 1984
 Let Go (Nada Surf album), 2002
 Let Go (Susie Luchsinger album) or the title song, 2008
 Let Go (Toby Lightman album) or the title song, 2008
 Let Go, by Knower, 2013
 Let Go, an EP by 38th Parallel, 2001

Songs 
 "Let Go" (Brother Phelps song), 1993
 "Let Go" (Central Cee song), 2022
 "Let Go" (Cheap Trick song), 1988
 "Let Go" (deadmau5 song), 2016
 "Let Go" (M-Flo song), 2004
 "Let Go" (Red song), 2007
 "Let Go", by 12 Stones from the film soundtrack Daredevil: The Album
 "Let Go", by Adema from Unstable
 "Let Go", by Against All Will from A Rhyme & Reason
 "Let Go", by BarlowGirl from Another Journal Entry
 "Let Go", by Beau Young Prince from the  Into the Spider-Verse soundtrack album
 "Let Go", by Blue Öyster Cult from The Revölution by Night
 "Let Go", by Brian Cadd from Moonshine
 "Let Go", by Christina Milian from Christina Milian
 "Let Go", by David Cook from Analog Heart
 "Let Go", by Dean Lewis from Same Kind of Different
 "Let Go", by FireHouse from Prime Time
 "Let Go", by For the Fallen Dreams from Back Burner
 "Let Go", by Frou Frou from Details
 "Let Go", by Grey Holiday from The Glorious Revolution
 "Let Go", by Hollywood Undead from Day of the Dead
 "Let Go", by Jacques Greene from Dawn Chorus
 "Let Go", by The Japanese Popstars
 "Let Go", by jj from jj n° 3
 "Let Go", by Lalah Hathaway from Self Portrait
 "Let Go", by Megan Rochell
 "Let Go", by Mia Rose
 "Let Go", by Ne-Yo from In My Own Words
 "Let Go", by Paul van Dyk from In Between
 "Let Go", by RAC
 "Let Go", by Redrama from Reflection
 "Let Go", by Ryan Adams from Ryan Adams
 "Let Go", by Saad Lamjarred
 "Let Go", by SafetySuit from These Times
 "Let Go", by the Sandpipers from The Wonder of You, 1969
 "Let Go", by Scuba Dice
 "Let Go", by SOiL from True Self
 "Let Go", by Vanessa Hudgens from V
 "Let Go (The Last Chapter)", by Sentenced from Frozen

Film and television 
 Let Go (film), a 2011 comedy starring David Denman
 Let Go, a 2006 TV sitcom pilot starring Bonnie Hunt

See also 
 Let It Go (disambiguation)
 Let's Go (disambiguation)
 Letting Go (disambiguation)